The Golden Cage: Three brothers, Three choices, One destiny  is a book by Iranian human rights activist Shirin Ebadi.

Plot
The book tells the story of three brothers whose lives were heavily influenced by Iranian history: the oldest, Abbas, was a soldier under the Shah; the second, Javad, was a communist activist; the younger, Ali, supported the Khomeini's Islamic revolution. All of their lives will be influenced by the worst chapters of Iranian history in the 20th century, including the Iranian Revolution, the Iran-Iraq war, and the executions of political opponents.

References 

2011 non-fiction books
Books about the Iranian Revolution
Iranian memoirs
Books about politics of Iran
Iran–Iraq War memoirs